The Sanremo Music Festival  2013 (63° Festival della Canzone Italiana di Sanremo 2013) was the 63rd annual Sanremo Music Festival, a televised song contest held at the Teatro Ariston in Sanremo, Liguria, between 12 and 16 February 2013 and broadcast by Rai 1.
The show, presented by Fabio Fazio with Italian comedy actress Luciana Littizzetto, featured two different competitions. The Big Artists section included 14 established Italian artists, competing with two songs each. During the semi-finals, a song for each artist was eliminated as a result of votes received by public and journalists. On 16 February 2013, Marco Mengoni, based on a combination of televotes and points awarded by a jury, was announced the winner of the competition, with his song "L'essenziale". 
The Newcomers' section featured eight songs performed by debuting or little known artists. On 13 and 14 February 2013, music journalists and televotes determined the four finalists of the competition. The final winner of the Newcomers' section, Antonio Maggio with the song "Mi servirebbe sapere", was announced on 15 February 2013, based on points awarded by a jury and on televotes.

On 24 January 2013, it was also announced that, as in 2011 and in 2012, an internal commission would have selected the artist representing Italy in the Eurovision Song Contest 2013 among all the competing acts. During the final, Marco Mengoni was announced as the Italian entrants.

Presenters and personnel

Immediately after Gianni Morandi, who presented the contest in 2011 and 2012, announced he didn't want to return to the Sanremo Music Festival for a third consecutive year, Fabio Fazio started being considered for the role. On 11 January 2012, Adnkronos revealed Fazio had signed with RAI, and on 18 January 2012, while presenting RAI's schedules for the second half of 2012 and the first part of 2013, Giancarlo Leone, then president of RAI's entertainment branch, officially announced Fazio as the presenter of the contest. 
Fazio, who had previously presented the contest in 1999 and in 2000, invited Italian comedy actress Luciana Littizzetto to join him, and Littizzetto confirmed her involvement as co-presenter on 30 September 2012, during Fazio's TV show Che tempo che fa.

Fabio Fazio was also chosen as the artistic director of the show, while Mauro Pagani was later chosen as the music director. Pagani also conducted the Sanremo Festival Orchestra. For the first time, the scenography was created by Francesca Montinaro. The show was directed by Duccio Forzano.

Awards

Categoria Campioni
 Winner: L'essenziale - Marco Mengoni
 Second Place: La canzone mononota - Elio e le Storie Tese
 Third Place: Se si potesse non morire - Modà
 Premio della Critica "Mia Martini" Campioni Category: La canzone mononota - Elio e le Storie Tese
 Premio al migliore arrangiamento Categoria Campioni: La canzone mononota - Elio e le Storie Tese
 Italian Act for the Eurovision Song Contest 2013: Marco Mengoni

Giovani Category
 Winner: Mi servirebbe sapere - Antonio Maggio
 Second Place: In equilibrio - Ilaria Porceddu
 Third Place: Il postino (amami uomo) - Renzo Rubino
 Fourth Place: Dietro l'intima ragione - Blastema
 Premio Emanuele Luzzati: Mi servirebbe sapere - Antonio Maggio
 Premio della Critica "Mia Martini" Giovani Category: Il postino (amami uomo) - Renzo Rubino
 Premio "Sergio Bardotti" al miglior testo Giovani Category: Le parole non servono più - Il Cile

Career Awards
 Toto Cutugno
 Ricchi e Poveri
 Al Bano
 Pippo Baudo

Nights

First night
During the first night, seven out of fourteen artists competing in the Big Artists section presented their two songs. At the end of the night, a song for each artist was eliminated, as a result of televotes combined with votes given by music journalists.

Big Artists section

Presenters
For each artist, the winning song was presented by a different celebrity:
 Marco Alemanno presented Marco Mengoni
 Ilaria D'Amico presented Raphael Gualazzi
 Valeria Bilello presented Daniele Silvestri
 Flavia Pennetta presented Simona Molinari & Peter Cincotti
 Cristina Parodi and Benedetta Parodi presented Marta sui Tubi
 Vincenzo Montella presented Maria Nazionale
 Stefano Tempesti presented Chiara Galiazzo

Guests
 Felix Baumgartner
 Maurizio Crozza
 Toto Cutugno

Second night
During the second night, the last seven artists competing in the Big Artists section performed both their songs, and a song for each of them was eliminated based on the combination of televotes and points given by music journalists. During the night, four acts in the Newcomers' section performed their entries, and two of them, Irene Ghiotto and Il Cile, were eliminated.

Big Artists section

Newcomers section

Presenters
As for the first night, for each act in the Big Artists section, the winning song was presented by a different celebrity:

 Max Biaggi and Eleonora Pedron presented Modà
 Jessica Rossi presented Simone Cristicchi
 Neri Marcorè presented Malika Ayane
 Filippa Lagerbäck presented Almamegretta
 Elisa Di Francisca, Arianna Errigo and Ilaria Salvatori presented Max Gazzè
 Carlo Cracco presented Annalisa
 Roberto Giacobbo presented Elio e le Storie Tese

Guests
 Italian actor Beppe Fiorello was the first guest of the second night. He was interviewed by Fabio Fazio about his role as Domenico Modugno in a TV film.
 Israeli model Bar Refaeli appeared during the night, co-presenting some artists.
 Italian-French singer Carla Bruni performed her new single "Chez Keith e Anita". After being briefly interviewed, she also played guitar while Littizzetto sang a parody of the hit "Quelqu'un m'a dit".
 Israeli singer Asaf Avidan performed a piano vocal version of his hit "Reckoning Song".

Third night

Big Artists section
During the third night, the selected song of each act competing in the Big Artists section was performed again.

Newcomers section

Fourth night

Big Artists section
During the fifth night, each act competing in the Big Artists section sang a cover of a song originally performed during a previous edition of the Sanremo Music Festival. Acts were optionally allowed to perform with Italian or international guests.

Newcomers section

Fifth night

Big Artists section (round 1)
During the fifth night, the fourteen songs competing in the Big Artists section were performed again. A ranking based on televotes and on a jury was established, and the top three artists advanced to the last round of the final.

Big Artists section (round 2)
In the second round, the top three songs were performed for the last time, and the final ranking was compiled, based on televotes and on points awarded by a jury. At the end of the night, Marco Mengoni was declared the winner, with his song "L'essenziale".

Ratings

See also
 Italy in the Eurovision Song Contest 2013

References

External links
 Sanremo Music Festival (official website)

Sanremo Music Festival by year
Eurovision Song Contest 2013
2013 in Italian music
2013 song contests
2013 in Italian television